Conigliaro is an Italian surname. Notable people with the surname include:

Billy Conigliaro (born 1947), American baseball outfielder
Marcos Conigliaro (born 1942), Argentine football coach and former player
Tony Conigliaro (1945–1990), American baseball right fielder, brother of Billy
Tony Conigliaro (mixologist), British bartender and mixologist

Italian-language surnames